Beneden Head is a steep-sided headland,  high, forming the north side of the entrance to Andvord Bay, on the west coast of Graham Land. It was discovered by the Belgian Antarctic Expedition, 1897–99, and named after Professor Edouard Van Beneden, president of the Belgica Commission and author of several of the zoological reports of the expedition.

See also
Orel Ice Fringe

References
 

Headlands of Graham Land
Danco Coast